Chanugondla village is a village in Dhone mandal in Indian state of Andhra Pradesh

References

Villages in Kurnool district